Elias Rahal, SMSP (born on 14 April 1942 in Ras Baalbek, Lebanon) is since 28 June 2004 the incumbent Archbishop of the Melkite Greek Catholic Archeparchy of Baalbek in Lebanon.

Life

Elias Rahal was ordained on June 28, 1970 by Melkite Paulist religious priests. Rahal studied at the Pontifical Lateran University in Rome and get a PhD from the University Sargessa in Furn-El-Shebak (Lebanon) as Doctor of Canon law.

At the Synod of Bishops of the Melkite Greek Catholic Church from 22 to 26 June 2004 Rahal was elected to succeed Cyril Salim Bustros as Archbishop of Baalbek. This choice was agreed by Pope Benedict XVI on 28 June 2004 and the Patriarch of Antioch, Gregory III Laham, BS consecrated him bishop. Archbishops Cyril Salim Bustros, SMSP and Jean Mansour, SMSP were assisted co-consecrators. Rahal was in October 2010 a participant in the Special Assembly of the Synod of Bishops for the Middle East.

Works
The Pontifical Lateran University published in 2007 the written Elias Rahal's PhD thesis, in French: "Le Synod de l'Eglise Grecque Melkite Catholic tenu a Jerusalem en 1849 etude historique, théologique et canonique (Pontificia Universitas Lateranensis, Theses ad doctoratum in iure canonico)".

References

External links
 http://www.catholic-hierarchy.org/bishop/brahal.html
 http://visnews-en.blogspot.com.br/2004_06_28_archive.html
 http://storico.radiovaticana.org/TED/Storico/2004-06/10791.html

Melkite Greek Catholic bishops
1942 births
Lebanese Melkite Greek Catholics
Living people
Pontifical Lateran University alumni
People from Baalbek District